Novaya is a rural locality (a village) in Yavengskoye Rural Settlement, Vozhegodsky District, Vologda Oblast, Russia. The population was 18 as of 2002.

Geography 
Novaya is located 19 km north of Vozhega (the district's administrative centre) by road. Pozharishche is the nearest rural locality.

References 

Rural localities in Vozhegodsky District